Cloverland may refer to some places in the United States:

 Cloverland, Indiana
 Cloverland, Houston, Texas
 Cloverland, Vilas County, Wisconsin, a town
 Cloverland, Douglas County, Wisconsin, a town
 Cloverland (community), Wisconsin, an unincorporated community

Cloverland Electric Cooperative

An early 20th century branding name for parts of the Upper Peninsula of Michigan